Cayuga Medical Center, officially referred to as Cayuga Medical Center at Ithaca and abbreviated as CMC, is a not-for-profit general hospital in Ithaca, New York, serving the residents of Broome, Cayuga, Chemung, Cortland, Schuyler, Seneca, Tioga, and Tompkins counties. The hospital has 204 beds in total, and is one of the largest hospitals in the Finger Lakes region and the Southern Tier.

In 2014, the hospital announced its partnership with Schuyler Hospital, another not-for-profit general hospital in nearby Montour Falls, New York and the creation of an umbrella organization for the two hospitals, the Cayuga Health System.

History
The hospital was originally known as the Tompkins Community Hospital, and located on East Hill in Ithaca. In the early 1970s, the hospital moved to a large new facility on West Hill. In early 1996 it changed its name to the Cayuga Medical Center.

References

Hospitals in New York (state)